Alloesia is a genus of beetles in the family Cerambycidae, containing the following species:

 Alloesia bicolor Waterhouse, 1880
 Alloesia bivittata Chevrolat, 1862
 Alloesia chlorophana Chevrolat, 1862
 Alloesia vittata (Fabricius, 1801)

References

Heteropsini